The Suzuki T90, also known as the Suzuki Wolf is a , two-stroke, twin-cylinder motorcycle produced by the Japanese Suzuki company between 1969 and 1972.The T90 was radically styled and except for the engine size, the model was the same as the Suzuki T125.

Technical details

Engine and transmission
The T90's engine was a 180° piston ported two stroke twin of unit construction and had alloy head and cast iron barrels with the cylinders sloped forward almost to the horizontal. Fuel was delivered by twin carburettors.

Primary drive was by helical gears to a multi-plate wet clutch and five speed gearbox. Chain drive took power to the rear wheel.

Cycle parts
The spine frame of the T90 was shared with the T125 and TC120 and called the Triform by Suzuki. Rear suspension was by swinging arm with twin shock absorbers. At the front telescopic forks were used. Brakes were drums front and rear. Spoked wheels were fitted with 250x18 front and 275x18 tyres rear.

A high level exhaust was fitted on both sides of the bike.

References

External links
 

T90
Motorcycles introduced in 1969
Two-stroke motorcycles
Motorcycles powered by straight-twin engines